The 2005 Sultan of Selangor Cup was played on 22 May 2005, at Shah Alam Stadium in Shah Alam, Selangor.

Match 
Source:

Players

Veterans 
A match between veterans of two teams are also held in the same day before the real match starts as a curtain raiser.

Source:

References 

2005 in Malaysian football
Selangor FA
Sultan of Selangor Cup